Kateryna Polunina (born 3 March 1988) is a Ukrainian former professional tennis player.

Polunina  won one doubles titles on the ITF tour. On 23 October 2006, she reached her best singles ranking of world number 518. On 27 February 2006, she peaked at world number 510 in the doubles rankings.

She made her WTA Tour main-draw debut at the 2007 İstanbul Cup.

ITF Circuit finals

Doubles: 5 (1 titles, 4 runner-ups)

References

External links
 
 

1988 births
Living people
Ukrainian female tennis players
21st-century Ukrainian women